The Tacna Province was a territorial division of Chile that existed between 1884 and 1929. It was ceded by the Treaty of Ancón in 1883 and placed under military administration, and then created on the 31st of October 1884, incorporating the former Peruvian provinces of Tacna and Arica of the also former Tacna Department, as well as a contested claim over Tarata, and was returned to Peru at midnight on the 28th of August 1929, under the terms agreed upon in the Treaty of Lima of the same year.

History

The province was first established on October 31, 1883 by a law promulgated by President Domingo Santa María which defined its limits as the Sama River to the north, the Quebrada de Camarones to the south, the Andes mountain range to the east, and the Pacific Ocean to the west. This was under the conditions of Treaty of Ancón, by means of which Chile achieved dominion over the Tarapacá Department, and possession of the provinces of Tacna and Arica for a decade, after which a plebiscite was to be held in 1894 to determine the region's sovereignty, however, it was never carried out. The provisional legal organization would end up working for 50 years, until 1929. During its early years, resistance was at its peak, with some Peruvian military personnel organizing guerrillas, such as Gregorio Albarracín's, of about a hundred men, which were defeated in battle in 1882, with Albarracín and his son being killed in action.

On December 26, 1908, half of Arica, then in the Province of Tacna, was destroyed by an earthquake. The city, as well as the region, were similarly affected by the much stronger earthquake in Valparaíso that happened just a couple of months prior, as well as its aftershocks.

In 1885 Chile integrated Tarata into the province, becoming in 1911 the Tarata Department, under the pretext that the town was to the east of the Sama river. Peru, however, did not recognize this annexation on the grounds that the territory was completely unaffected by the Treaty of Ancón. Around this time, raids by Peruvian smugglers as well as soldiers took place in the region, and there were also rumours of war, including unfounded claims of Peru mobilizing troops against the Chilean border, which were denied on more than one occasion. In 1921, however, Chile abolished the department, and in 1925, amid plebiscite-related protests, gave back the city to Peru under the mediation of U.S. President Calvin Coolidge, who enforced the limits agreed upon on the north, which did not include the city. Coolidge showed himself to be in favor of the Peruvian claims on several occasions during the duration of the dispute, more so than other heads of state. Around the same time, a commission, headed by U.S. General John J. Pershing arrived to assist with the planned Tacna-Arica plebiscite, which eventually would never take place. Francisco Tudela y Varela became involved in the issue during his time serving as foreign minister from 1917 to 1918.

On April 23, 1921, measles in epidemic form was reported in the province, as well as neighboring Antofagasta, occurring among troops. At the same time, smallpox was reported present.

Reincorporation to Peru

On June 3, 1929 the Treaty of Lima was signed by then Peruvian Representative Pedro José Rada y Gamio and Chilean Representative Emiliano Figueroa Larrain, leading to the effective return of Tacna to Peru at midnight, on the 28th of August 1929, creating the Department of Tacna, and Arica (both the former Peruvian Department as well as some territory of the Department of Tacna ceded by the treaty) was permanently given to Chile, being integrated into the Tarapacá Province, ending the existence of the Chilean Province of Tacna. Nevertheless, even with the border conflict officially over, controversy would continue among nationals of both Peru and Bolivia, who would continue her claims over her lost territories, seeking once again a connection to the ocean with the assistance of international mediators on the issue which is yet to be solved, and continues to this day. The handover had no official ceremony, with some Chilean officials temporarily staying behind to assist Peru regarding the new administration. Nonetheless, the return of the territory was met with celebrations in Peru, with President Augusto B. Leguía overseeing a military parade in Lima, and church bells ringing in celebration. Some Chilean citizens, who had remained in the province after the handover asked to be repatriated.

Timeline
 June 4: the news of the Treaty of Lima reach Tacna.
 July 21: the withdrawal of Chilean citizens begins in Tacna, with most being headed towards nearby Arica.
 July 28: The Treaty of Lima is promulgated in Chile.
 July 28: The Húsares de Junín regiment leaves Tarata for Tacna under the command of Colonel Ricardo Luna and Commander Carlos Beytía.

 August 1: the Peruvian government decrees the political and judicial organization of the Department of Tacna and allocates funds for it.
 August 6: the treaty for compliance is published in the Official Journal of the Republic of Chile.
 August 14: The "Tacna Detachment" of the Civil Guard is formed in Lima with three companies under the command of Captains Guillermo Zavala Ituchetegui, Estanislao Matta Delfín and Justo Frías Zeballos.
 August 21: The Mantaro transport ship departs from Callao with the entire Peruvian delegation that was going to receive Tacna, which includes policemen, teachers, officials and public employees of the Peruvian government. The newspaper La Patria appears in the city, edited by Raquel Delgado de Castro.
 August 26: The Chilean newspaper El Pacífico stops circulation.
 August 27: As the Peruvian delegation is set to arrive in Arica, journalists are waiting for them since the early hours of the morning. At noon the delegation arrives. The first to leave the ship are the members of the Peruvian commission led by Pedro José Rada and Gamio, who are received by Chilean representatives and Peruvians from Arica.

The Peruvian delegation boards the train in Arica and arrives in Tacna at 5pm, where they are received at the railway station with cheers for Tacna, Peru and Leguía. At 5:00 p.m., from Tarata, the Husares de Junín enter Tacna through Alto Lima street. At 11:00 p.m., the Tacna Civil Guard Detachment arrives at the El Escuadrón police station, where Captain Guillermo Zavala Ituchetegui receives them. At 1:00 a.m. on August 28, the last 5 Chilean policemen are relieved, who retire to a checkpoint in Caramolle and then leave for Arica.
 August 28: The city of Tacna is full of Peruvian flags and people from Calana, Pachía, Sama, Locumba (which had formerly served as the capital of the rump Peruvian department), Ilabaya, Candarave and Tarata (also formerly administered by Chile) gather in the streets. The residents are concentrated in the Paseo Cívico and the Pasaje Vigil, wearing rosettes and red and white ribbons.

The delegations from Peru and Chile meet in the city's courthouse, where the Commission in charge of the 1926 plebiscite was based. At 2:00 p.m., the Peruvian delegates, Pedro José Rada y Gamio, General José Ramón Pizarro, Arturo Núñez Chávez, Blondell, Ángel Gustavo Cornejo and Monsignor Mariano Holguín and the Chilean delegates, Gonzalo Robles and Alberto Serrano, who sign the Tacna Handover Act; the meeting ends at 3:00 p.m. At the same time, the policemen under the command of Captain Estanislao Matta Delfín began patrolling the city. After that act; Gathered in the Pasaje Vigil, Pedro José Rada y Gamio delivers a speech on the delivery of Tacna. The official delegation and the residents leave the Vigil passage in the direction of the Paseo Cívico.

Thousands of locals in the Paseo Cívico were eager to witness the arrival of the Chilean and Peruvian delegates, signatories of the Handover Act, and the hoisting of the Peruvian flag in the Prefecture. When the flagpole was found damaged, however, local Edgar Empson climbed the Tacna Cathedral to hoist it on its left tower. The band of the Húsares de Junín Cavalry Regiment of the Peruvian Army then proceeded to play the National Anthem of Peru. Monsignor Holguin also broadcast his speech, followed by the ringing of the Cathedral's bells. The parade continued with the participation of the Húsares de Junín, the Junín Guard and the police forces.

At 5:00 p.m., the new mayor of Tacna, Armando Vargas Blondell, is sworn in. The president of the Court of Justice, Carlos A. Téllez, and the prefect, Federico Fernandini Muñoz, are also sworn in. The day ended with a dinner for the delegates and the new authorities. Meanwhile, in Lima, military parades were held at the old Santa Beatriz Racetrack (today Campo de Marte) as part of the celebrations.

 In the days after the handover, 15 schools and 3 National Colleges were created.
 On October 18, the Coronel Bolognesi football club was created.
 During the government of Juan Velasco Alvarado, August 28 is declared "Civic Day".
Thus, on the last week of August, the festivities of Tacna are celebrated, starting on the 27th, with the Offering of Youth, followed on the 28th by the Tribute to the Woman from Tacna and finally a flag procession. It ends on August 30 with Saint Rose of Lima day.

Administration

The Government of Chile pursued a policy of assimilation known as chileanization, which was met with local resistance, as well as criticism from the Peruvian government, who withdrew their delegations in 1901, and, after re-establishing it in 1905, withdrew it again in 1910 as a response to the closure of Peruvian institutions as well as the expulsion of Peruvians "whose influence would contribute to the maintenance of the Peruvian national spirit." It also appointed several intendants to its Provinces, including Tacna. The intendants of Tacna were based in their headquarters in the city of Tacna and served under the title with the exception of Col. Arrate and Lt. Col. Beytía.

List of intendants of Tacna

Administrative divisions

The Tacna Province was divided into the following departments, themselves divided into communes:

Notable people
 Salvador Allende and his family, who lived eight years in the city, from 1909 to 1916. Despite having been born in Santiago, Allende spent his childhood and youth in Tacna, having studied in the Liceo de Tacna.
 Jorge Basadre, Peruvian historian known for his extensive publications about the independent history of his country.

See also
 War of the Pacific
 Consequences of the War of the Pacific
 Chilenization of Tacna, Arica and Tarapacá
 Administrative divisions of Chile
 Department of Tacna
 Litoral Department

Notes

References

Historical provinces of Chile
1884 establishments in Chile
States and territories disestablished in 1929
States and territories established in 1884
1929 disestablishments in Chile